Regiunea Baia Mare (Baia Mare Region) was one of the newly established (in 1950) administrative divisions of the People's Republic of Romania, copied after the Soviet style of territorial organization.

History

The capital of the region was Baia Mare, and its territory comprised an area similar to what are nowadays the Maramureș and Satu Mare counties. In 1952 the raion Vișeu was attached to the Baia Mare Region from the Rodna Region, after the dissolution of the latter. In 1960 the name of the region was changed to Maramureș.

Neighbors

The Baia Mare Region had as neighbors:

1950–1952: East: Rodna Region; South: Cluj Region and Bihor Region; West: Hungarian People's Republic; North: Ukrainian Soviet Socialist Republic.
1952–1968: East: Suceava Region; South: Cluj Region and Oradea Region; West: Hungarian People's Republic; North: Ukrainian Soviet Socialist Republic.

Raions

1950–1952: Baia Mare, Satu Mare, Sighet, Oaș, Carei, Cehu Silvaniei, Lăpuș.
1952–1968: Baia Mare, Satu Mare, Sighet, Oaș, Carei, Cehu Silvaniei, Lăpuș, Vișeu.

Baia Mare
Baia Mare